Rirpu (Quechua for mirror, possibly erroneously also spelled Sirpu) is a  mountain in the Bolivian Andes. It is located in the Cochabamba Department, Mizque Province, Alalay Municipality. It lies southwest of Wanq'uni.

References 

Mountains of Cochabamba Department